Kent County is a county located in the central part of the U.S. state of Delaware. As of the 2020 census, the population was 181,851, making it the least populous county in Delaware. The county seat is Dover, the state capital of Delaware. It is named for Kent, an English county.

Kent County comprises the Dover, DE Metropolitan Statistical Area, which is included in the Philadelphia-Reading-Camden, PA-NJ-DE-MD Combined Statistical Area.

History

In about 1670 the English began to settle in the valley of the St. Jones River, earlier known as Wolf Creek. On June 21, 1680, the Duke of York chartered St. Jones County, which was carved out of New Amstel/New Castle and Hoarkill/Sussex counties. St. Jones County was transferred to William Penn on August 24, 1682, and became part of Penn's newly chartered Delaware Colony.

Penn ordered a court town to be laid out, and the courthouse was built in 1697. The town of Dover, named after the town of Dover in England's Kent, was finally laid out in 1717, in what was then known as the Lower Counties. It was designated as the capital of Delaware in 1777. In 1787 Delaware was first state to ratify the U.S. Constitution, and became "the First State." Through much of the late 18th century, the economy of Kent County was based on small grain farms. As a result, farmers did not need as many slaves as did owners of tobacco plantations. Delaware had a high proportion of free blacks among its African-American population by the early 19th century. 

In the 1960s, Dover was a center of manufacturing of spacesuits worn by NASA astronauts in the Apollo moon flights by ILC Dover, now based in the small town of Frederica. The suits, dubbed the "A7L," was first flown on the Apollo 7 mission in October 1967, and was the suit worn by Neil Armstrong and Buzz Aldrin on the Apollo 11 mission. The company still manufactures spacesuits to this day—the present-day Space Shuttle "soft" suit components (the arms and legs of the suit).

Geography

Kent County, like all of Delaware's counties, is subdivided into Hundreds. There are several explanations given for how the Hundreds were arrived at, either being an area containing 100 families, an area containing 100 people, or an area that could raise 100 militiamen. Kent County was originally apportioned into six Hundreds: Duck Creek, Little Creek, Dover, Murderkill, Milford and Mispillion. In 1867, the Delaware legislature split Murderkill Hundred into North Murderkill Hundred and South Murderkill Hundred.  In 1869, the legislature formed Kenton Hundred from parts of Little Creek and Duck Creek Hundred.  Today the county contains eight Hundreds.

Adjacent counties

 New Castle County - north
 Salem County, New Jersey - northeast
 Cumberland County, New Jersey - east
 Cape May County, New Jersey - east
 Sussex County - south
 Caroline County, Maryland - southwest
 Queen Anne's County, Maryland - west
 Kent County, Maryland - northwest

National protected area
 Bombay Hook National Wildlife Refuge

Climate
Kent County has a humid subtropical climate (Cfa) according to the Köppen climate classification. The Trewartha climate classification considers the climate oceanic (Do) because only seven months average >50 °F (>10 °C.) All months average above freezing and Dover has three months averaging above 22 °C (71.6 °F.) The hardiness zone is mostly 7a with very small areas of 7b.

Transportation

Major highways

The following state highways are located in Kent County:

Railroads
The Delmarva Central Railroad operates two freight lines through Kent County. The Delmarva Subdivision runs north–south along the US 13 corridor through Farmington, Harrington, Felton, Wyoming, Dover, Cheswold, and Clayton and the Indian River Subdivision branches from the Delmarva Subdivision at Harrington and runs east to Houston and Milford along the DE 14 corridor. There is no passenger rail service in the county.

Public transportation
DART First State operates bus service within Kent County. There are several local bus routes that serve the Dover area. In addition, DART First State operates inter-county service to Wilmington, Newark, Georgetown, and Lewes, along with seasonal service to Lewes and Rehoboth Beach.

Airports
Kent County contains the following public-use and military airports:
 Chandelle Estates Airport in Dover
 Chorman Airport in Farmington
 Dover Air Force Base in Dover
 Delaware Airpark in Cheswold
 Henderson Aviation Airport in Felton
 Jenkins Airport in Wyoming
 Smyrna Airport in Smyrna

Government and politics

|}

Kent County is governed by the Kent County Levy Court, which consists of seven members, six of whom are elected by district and the seventh who is elected at-large. The current members of the Kent County Levy Court are:
Joanne Masten  (D) - 1st district 
Jeffrey W. Hall (D) - 2nd district 
Allan F. Angel (D) - 3rd district (Vice President)
Eric L. Buckson (R) - 4th district
George Jody Sweeney (D) - 5th district 
Glen M. Howell (R) - 6th district 
Terry L. Pepper (D) - At-Large (President)

The county row offices are held by:
Betty Lou McKenna (D) - Recorder of Deeds
Harold K. Brode (D) - Register of Wills 
Brenda A. Wootten (D) - Clerk of the Peace
Brian E. Lewis (D) - Sheriff

Politically, Kent County is a swing county in local, state, and federal elections. The county is often used in state politics to determine a party or candidate's strength in statewide elections and is often considered a bellwether county, having voting for the winner of the national presidential election in 17 out of the last 18 presidential elections.

In the 2016 general elections, Republican Presidential Nominee Donald Trump won Kent County with 49.81% of the vote compared to Democratic Nominee Hillary Clinton's 44.91% out of 74,260 votes cast. In the 2016 Delaware Gubernatorial Election, Democratic nominee John Carney won 49.68% of the vote compared to Republican Colin Bonini's 48.05%.

In the Delaware General Assembly, 8 of the 41 seats in the Delaware State House of Representatives. As of March 2020, Democrats held 4 seats and Republicans held 4 seats. In the Delaware State Senate, 5 senate districts represent parts of Kent County. As of March 2020 there were 3 Republican seats and 2 Democratic seats.

Demographics

2000 census
As of the census of 2000, there were 126,697 people, 47,224 households, and 33,623 families living in the county. The population density was 215 people per square mile (83/km2). There were 50,481 housing units at an average density of 86 per square mile (33/km2). The racial makeup of the county was 73.49% White, 20.66% Black or African American, 0.64% Native American, 1.69% Asian, 0.04% Pacific Islander, 1.27% from other races, and 2.22% from two or more races. 3.21% of the population were Hispanic or Latino of any race. 13.3% were of German, 11.3% United States or American, 10.9% Irish, 10.0% English and 5.4% Italian ancestry. 92.5% spoke English and 3.3% Spanish as their first language.

There were 47,224 households, out of which 35.50% had children under the age of 18 living with them, 52.90% were married couples living together, 13.80% had a female householder with no husband present, and 28.80% were non-families. 23.00% of all households were made up of individuals, and 8.40% had someone living alone who was 65 years of age or older. The average household size was 2.61 and the average family size was 3.06.

In the county, the population was spread out, with 27.30% under the age of 18, 10.10% from 18 to 24, 29.80% from 25 to 44, 21.20% from 45 to 64, and 11.70% who were 65 years of age or older. The median age was 34 years. For every 100 females there were 93.10 males. For every 100 females age 18 and over, there were 89.60 males.

The median income for a household in the county was $40,950, and the median income for a family was $46,504. Males had a median income of $32,660 versus $24,706 for females. The per capita income for the county was $18,662. About 8.10% of families and 10.70% of the population were below the poverty line, including 14.80% of those under age 18 and 8.80% of those age 65 or over.

2010 census
As of the 2010 census, there were 162,310 people, 60,278 households, and 42,290 families living in the county. The racial makeup of the county was 67.8% white, 24.0% black or African American, 2.0% Asian, 0.6% American Indian, 0.1% Pacific islander, 2.0% from other races, and 3.5% from two or more races. Those of Hispanic or Latino origin made up 5.8% of the population. In terms of ancestry, 17.5% were German, 15.4% were Irish, 11.5% were English, 7.2% were Italian, and 5.9% were American.

Of the 60,278 households, 35.6% had children under the age of 18 living with them, 50.1% were married couples living together, 14.9% had a female householder with no husband present, 29.8% were non-families, and 23.6% of all households were made up of individuals. The average household size was 2.62 and the average family size was 3.09. The median age was 36.6 years.

The median income for a household in the county was $53,183 and the median income for a family was $60,949. Males had a median income of $43,418 versus $35,603 for females. The per capita income for the county was $24,194. About 9.3% of families and 12.5% of the population were below the poverty line, including 21.0% of those under age 18 and 7.7% of those age 65 or over.

Amish community
Kent County is home to an Amish community that resides to the west of Dover, consisting of 9 church districts and about 1,650 people. The Amish first settled in Kent County in 1915. The area is home to several Amish businesses selling items such as Amish food, furniture, quilts, and handmade crafts. Every September, the Amish Country Bike Tour, one of the largest cycling events in Delaware, takes place in the area. In recent years, increasing development has led to the decline in the number of Amish living in the community.

Communities

Cities

Dover
Harrington
Milford (partly in Sussex County)

Towns

Bowers
Camden
Cheswold
Clayton (partly in New Castle County)
Farmington
Felton
Frederica
Hartly
Houston
Kenton
Leipsic
Little Creek
Magnolia
Smyrna (partly in New Castle County)
Viola
Woodside
Wyoming

Census-designated places

Dover Air Force Base
Highland Acres
Kent Acres
Rising Sun-Lebanon
Riverview
Rodney Village
Woodside East

Unincorporated localities
Andrewville
Berrytown
Little Heaven
Marydel

Education
School districts include:
 Caesar Rodney School District
 Capital School District
 Lake Forest School District
 Milford School District
 Smyrna School District
 Woodbridge School District

Tertiary institutions:
 Delaware State University (DSU)

Wesley College merged into DSU in 2021.

See also

National Register of Historic Places listings in Kent County, Delaware

References

External links
Kent County webpage - Archived
Kent County & Greater Dover Convention and Visitors Bureau

 
Delaware counties
1683 establishments in Delaware
Populated places established in 1683